Megachile semirufa is a species of bee in the family Megachilidae. It was described by Frédéric Jules Sichel in 1867.

References

Semirufa
Insects described in 1867
Taxa named by Frédéric Jules Sichel